Daddy's Girls is the 2006 debut novel by Tasmina Perry. The Independent described the novel as a "Shirley Conranesque retro romp". The novel follows four glamorous daughters whose father is murdered.

References

Novels by Tasmina Perry
HarperCollins books
2006 British novels
2006 debut novels